Trevor Little is an Australian former professional tennis player.

Little was a junior doubles champion at the 1974 Australian Open (with David Carter). His best tournament success on tour came in 1975 when he won the Malaysian championships, beating former champion Gondo Widjojo in the final. He had a first round win over Peter McNamara (in five sets) at the 1976 Australian Open, before being eliminated by third-seed Tony Roche. Following his playing career he became a coach in Victoria.

Little is the uncle of tennis siblings John and Sally Peers, through his tennis playing sister Elizabeth.

References

External links
 
 

Year of birth missing (living people)
Living people
Australian male tennis players
Australian Open (tennis) junior champions
Grand Slam (tennis) champions in boys' doubles